Chile–Uruguay relations refers to the current and historical relations between the Republic of Chile and the Oriental Republic of Uruguay. Both nations are members of the Cairns Group, Community of Latin American and Caribbean States, Group of 77, Latin American Integration Association, Organization of American States, Organization of Ibero-American States and the United Nations.

History
Both Chile and Uruguay share a common history in the fact that both nations were once part of the Spanish Empire. During the Spanish colonial period, Chile was then part of the Viceroyalty of Peru and administered from Lima while Uruguay was governed from the Viceroyalty of the Río de la Plata in Buenos Aires. In 1818, Chile declared its independence. In 1828, Uruguay obtained its independence after the Cisplatine War.

In October 1972, Uruguayan Air Force Flight 571 crashed in the Andes mountains carrying 45 passengers and crew, most of them Uruguayan Rugby players traveling to Chile for a match. The 40 survivors of the crash spent two months in the mountains and resorted to cannibalism to survive. In December 1972, 16 survivors were left when discovered and carried to safety. The incident became known as The Miracle of the Andes.

During the 1970s and 1980s, both nations suffered from dictatorships and cooperated with the United States in Operation Condor. In 1973, nine Uruguayan citizens were detained in Chile and remain missing to this day. In April 1976, President Augusto Pinochet paid a visit to Uruguay and met with President Juan María Bordaberry.

Since the restoration of democracy in both nations, relations have been close and both nations have participated in several multilateral regional organizations. There have been numerous visits and reunions by leaders of both nations. Both nations encourage the convergence between the Pacific Alliance (for which Chile is a member of) and MERCOSUR (for which Uruguay is a member of), with the aim of promoting Latin American integration. Both nations also work closely together in political, economic, cultural and scientific cooperation. They also work closely in matters of social development, gender, environment, energy, innovation, Antarctic affairs and human rights, among other areas.

Bilateral agreements
Both nations have signed several agreements such as a Cultural Agreement (1968); Agreement for Free Transit for Tourists, their Personal Effects and Vehicles (1979); Agreement on Cooperation in the Field of Peaceful Uses of Nuclear Energy (1979); Agreement on the Exchange of Information on Criminal Records (1981); Agreement on Prevention, Control, Supervision and Repression of the Abuse and Illicit Traffic of Narcotic Drugs and Psychotropic Substances and their Precursors and Chemical Producers (1991); Agreement Establishing a System of Bilateral Consultations on Antarctic Matters (1991); Tourist Cooperation Agreement (1991); Memorandum for International Cooperation in the Area of Micro and Small Industry Development (1992); Agreement for the Establishment of a Bilateral Integration Council (1992); Agreement Establishing a Consultation Mechanism between both countries Ministry's of Foreign Affairs (1992); Agreement for Technical and Scientific Cooperation (1993); Social Security Agreement (1997); Air Transport Agreement (2004); Memorandum of Understanding established by the Bilateral Trade and Investment Commission (2007); Agreement of Cooperation between Uruguay's National Institute for Women and Chile's National Service for Women (2008); Investment Agreement (2010); Agreement to Eliminate Double Taxation in Relation to Income and Capital Taxes and to Prevent Tax Evasion and Avoidance (2016) and a Free Trade Agreement between both nations (2018).

Resident diplomatic missions
 Chile has an embassy in Montevideo.
 Uruguay has an embassy in Santiago.

See also
 Chileans in Uruguay
 Uruguayans in Chile

References 

 
Uruguay
Chile